Charlotte Fire Station No. 4 is a historic fire station located at Charlotte, Mecklenburg County, North Carolina. It was listed on the National Register of Historic Places in 2016.

History 
In 1926, the fire station was designed by American architect Charles Christian Hook and built by J. A. Gardner. It occupies 0.228-acre lot near the northeast corner of the intersection of North Graham Street and West Fifth Street in downtown Charlotte, North Carolina. The station continued in its original use until 1972. It was replaced by a new fire station at 525 North Church Street.

See also 
 Fire Station No. 2 (Charlotte, North Carolina)
 National Register of Historic Places listings in Mecklenburg County, North Carolina

References

Fire stations on the National Register of Historic Places in North Carolina
Fire stations completed in 1926
Buildings and structures in Charlotte, North Carolina
National Register of Historic Places in Mecklenburg County, North Carolina
1926 establishments in North Carolina